Special Investigation Branch (SIB) was the name given to the detective branches of all three British military police arms: the Royal Navy Police, Royal Military Police and Royal Air Force Police. It was most closely associated with the Royal Military Police, which had the largest SIB. SIB investigators usually operated in plain clothes, although they did wear uniforms when serving overseas. Members were usually senior non-commissioned officers (sergeants or petty officers or above) or commissioned officers, although the Royal Air Force SIB was open to corporals and Acting Corporals. In December 2022, the Defence Serious Crime Unit was enacted which replaced all three service SIBs.

In Dec 22 SIB was disbanded and replaced with the tri-service Defence Serious Crime Unit

Royal Navy Police SIB
The Royal Navy SIB is the smallest of the three SIBs, with the SIO holding the rank of Lieutenant Commander. They investigate:

all incidents falling within Schedule 2 of the Armed Forces Act 2006;
 Level 3/4 investigations;
 circumstances prescribed in accordance with the Armed Forces Act 2006;
 complicated cases involving multiple units (for instance, assaults involving a large number of personnel from different ships).

In Dec 22 SIB was disbanded and replaced with the tri-service Defence Serious Crime Unit

Royal Military Police SIB
Although an SIB appears to have existed in the British Army of the Rhine in Germany between 1919 and 1926, the origins of the army's SIB are in 1940, when twenty Scotland Yard detectives were enlisted in the Corps of Military Police to deal with the pilfering of military stores within the British Expeditionary Force (BEF) in France. The unit was formed on the recommendations of Detective Chief Inspector George Hatherill (who later went on to investigate the serial killers John Reginald Christie and John George Haigh, and the Great Train Robbery) and command was given to Detective Superintendent Clarence Campion, head of Scotland Yard's Criminal Record Office, who was commissioned as a Major. Campion was hit in the head by shrapnel during the Dunkirk evacuation and died on 20 May 1940, the only SIB casualty of the BEF. After this beginning, the SIB was established on a full-time basis. One of the first group of detectives, Frank Elliott, was sent out to Cairo, Egypt. Under the supervision of Colonel Claude Harper, Elliott managed a 500-man force which investigated crime in Egypt, Palestine and later Libya.

The SIB (RMP) now consists of about three hundred personnel, including Scenes of Crime Officers and forensic technicians. It is divided into numbered units called Investigation Platoons (for instance, 33 Inv Pl SIB Regt), which are subdivided into Detachments, each usually commanded by a Warrant Officer Class 2. There is a section or detachment on most major British Army stations. There is also a Territorial Army section, made up of CID officers and ex-regular SIB. The Headquarters SIB Regiment is at Campion Lines at Bulford, Wiltshire. Within the RMP, SIB is known as "the Branch" or more commonly "the Feds".

In 2006 the SIB was subjected to an inspection by Her Majesty's Inspectorate of Constabulary (HMIC). The Armed Forces Bill 2006 seeks to require the SIB to refer investigations into inherently serious crimes directly to the Service Prosecuting Authority (SPA) rather than to commanding officers.

SIB recruit class 1 and 2 Cpl's from the General Police Duties employment group of the Royal Military Police, and each candidate undergoes 12 months Foundation Training to determine suitability.  During training, an extensive testing phase is completed utilizing the Distance Learning Package (DLP), coupled with a series of exams including the entrance exam.  Students who pass the entrance exam are eligible for further training on the Serious Crime Investigation Course (SCIC), a 9-week residential course held at the Defence School of Policing and Guarding, Southwick Park, Fareham.  On completion, successful candidates are placed onto a merit board awaiting full-time employment as an SIB Investigator.  Passing the SCIC does not automatically qualify candidates employment with the SIB, and all candidates who were successful in passing the SCIC but unsuitable for employment with the SIB will be returned to their respective unit as a Level 3 trained investigator.

In Dec 22, SIB was disband replaced with the tri-service Defence Serious Crime Unit

Royal Air Force Police SIB
The Royal Air Force Police Special Investigation Branch, formed in 1918, has the distinction of being the only branch-specific investigative unit entrusted with a major war crime. Five officers and fourteen NCOs were given the assignment of investigating the Stalag Luft III murders immediately following the Second World War. In direct recognition of this, the RAF Police SIB was granted permission to use The Great Escape March as its distinct march by CAS in 2015.

The Royal Air Force Police currently has one SIB Squadron based at RAF Halton with two subordinate Flights: SIB A Flt  based at RAF Halton, and SIB B Flt based at RAF College Cranwell, this Squadron sits within No. 1 Specialist Police Wing.

Personnel undertake the Serious Crime Investigation Course (SCIC) before going on to complete a number of Home Office courses such as SOIT, National drugs, and Tier 2,3 & 5 interviewer, Family Liaison Officer, Specialist Fraud etc.

The RAF Police SIB differs slightly from its RMP counterparts in terms of rank structure, employing a mix of Corporals and Sergeants. Both SIB(S) and SIB(N) additionally employ a number of Acting Corporals.

SIB personnel extensively deployed with their RMP SIB counterparts throughout the duration of Op Banner, Northern Ireland; Op Telic, Iraq; and Op Herrick, Afghanistan in support of combat operations.

Her Majesty's Inspectorate of Constabulary conducted an inspection of the SIB in 2009.

In Dec 22 SIB was disbanded and replaced with the tri-service Defence Serious Crime Unit

DCSU
In December 2022, the Defence Serious Crime Unit was formed to replace the three separate strands of single service SIBs. It will be headquartered at Southwick Park, and will combine personnel from all three services. Its remit is to investigate serious crimes outside of the normal chain of command.

See also
 Redcap (1960s ITV series)
 Red Cap (2000s BBC series)

References

External links
 Royal Military Police Association (SIB Branch)
 ROYAL MILITARY POLICE - SPECIAL INVESTIGATIONS BRANCH (UNITED KINGDOM) - British Army official website

Military police of the United Kingdom